Emil Grallert (1848 - 1923) was German Consul in Zanzibar from 1877 to 1884. He was born to Anastasius Grallert and Johanna Pabst in Hamburg on 21 November 1848. He died on 16 January 1923.

References

1848 births
1923 deaths
Diplomats from Hamburg
Ambassadors to Zanzibar